Ivan Fyodorovich Novikov (12 September 1925 – 12 December 2016) was a Soviet and Russian surgeon and urologist. In 1962 Novikov proposed an endovesical procaine blockade of the ureteric orifice during kidney stone disease. In 1970 he patented a device to remove stones from the ureter.

References

Soviet urologists
Soviet surgeons
Russian surgeons
1925 births
2016 deaths
20th-century surgeons